Swami Lakshmanananda Saraswati (–23 August 2008) and four of his disciples were murdered on 23 August 2008 in the State of Odisha in India. Saraswati was a Hindu monk and a Vishva Hindu Parishad leader. Seven Catholic Panos and one Maoist leader were convicted in the case.

Previous attack 
Saraswati was on his way to visit Brahmanigoan village when a bus belonging to Sugriba Singh, a Catholic Pano  leader and Biju Janata Dal Member of Parliament (Lower House) obstructed the road. Saraswati was attacked on the spot- Swami, his driver and his security guard had all sustained injuries. In a statement, Saraswati had identified Radha Kanta Nayak, an Indian National Congress Member of Parliament in the Rajya Sabha, as being involved in the attack. Radha Kanta Nayak also served as chief of the Christian-evangelical organization World Vision. Saraswati had further stated that this was the seventh time that they had failed to kill him.

Threat 
Saraswati received an anonymous threat only a week before his assassination. Ashram authorities also filed a First Information Report (or FIR) with the local police. However, no steps were taken to provide appropriate security cover to him, despite ample evidence that there were very real threats being made on his life and the lives of those he served. The Government of Odisha later admitted that lapses might have occurred in his security and would place Kandhamal Superintendent of Police Nikhil Kanodia and officer-in-charge of Tumudibandha police station Jena under suspension.

Assassination 
Saraswati was murdered on Janmashtami Day of 2008 while visiting with pupils at the Kanya Ashram (a residential girls' school) in Tumudibandh, about 100 km from Phulbani, the district headquarters of Kandhamal district. Four of his disciples, including a boy, were also killed by gunfire.

The Kanya Ashram housed 130 girls on the day of the Janmashtami festival and many of the girls were eyewitnesses to the killing, as reported by Indian Express. A group of thirty to forty armed men surrounded the Ashram. Four of the assailants carried AK-47s and many others had locally made revolvers. Two of the four government provided security guards had gone home to eat, the assailants tied and gagged the two remaining guards.

Civil disorder and riots

Hundreds of people gathered on the route to pay their last respects to Saraswati. Riots erupted when the procession passed through localities with Catholic populations. Catholics, who were perceived to be Indian National Congress party supporters, were targeted everywhere; in some places many Hindu families were also attacked because they were Congress supporters. The attackers included activists of the VHP, the Bajrang Dal and other Sangh Parivar organisations, and workers of the BJP that was a partner in the government headed by Naveen Patnaik. The violence also saw attacks on Catholics who belonged to the Pano Scheduled Castes and on people who claimed tribal status on the grounds that they spoke the Kui language of the Khond tribal people. The Kui Samaj, which unites members of the native Kondh tribe (both Hindus and Protestant Khonds) in Kandhamal, was found to be leading the attacks on Catholic Panos.

Investigations
The government announced a special investigative probe into the attack.

The police arrested Pradesh Kumar Das, an employee of the Indian branch of World Vision, a Christian charity organisation, from Khadagpur while escaping from the district at Buguda. In another drive, two other persons, Vikram Digal and William Digal, were arrested from the house of Lal Digal, a local militant Catholic, from Nuasahi at Gunjibadi, Nuagaan. They have admitted to having joined a group of twenty-eight other assailants.

On 28 August, a letter of denial was received by some media outlets, the VHP office in the Gajapati District of Orissa and the Bajrang Dal from a Maoist group. While the letter denied that the Central Committee of the Kotagarha branch of the Maoists had approved the attack, it claimed that some Maoists may have been bribed by Pano Catholics to launch the attack.  Soon after the appearance of the aforementioned letter, Azad, a leader of the Maoist People's Liberation Guerrilla Army, claimed responsibility for the murder of Lakshmanananda.  Azad was suspected by the police of leading the attack himself.  On 9 September 2008 the Maoists, who work underground, made an official press release claiming responsibility for the killing of Saraswati. A few claims that Maoist sympathizers of south Orissa had initially denied the role of CPI-Maoist were made in the murder of VHP leaders that sparked off communal violence in Kandhamnal district. Communist Party of India (Maoist) leader Sabyasachi Panda claimed that they killed Swami Laxmanananda Saraswati and four of his disciples at his Jalespeta ashram on 23 August. In March 2009 police arrested Central Committee and Politburo member of CPI (Maoist), Ashutosh Tudu for murder of Swami Laxmanananda.

On Wednesday 22 July 2009, a young Maoist couple, Surendra and Ruppi Pidikka alias Jaya Venkwara claimed to have been involved in the Saraswati's killing and surrendered to the Orissa police.

Reconstructing the final moments of the killing of VHP leader Laxmanananda and his four disciples in Kandhamal's Jalespeta ashram in August 2008, Orissa police said that a Maoist who surrendered this week claimed there were four policemen at the ashram but they fled when the Maoists announced that they had come looking for the Swami. Four of the six Maoists who carried out the attack were from Chhattisgarh, the police were told. Rayagada SP Ashis Kumar Singh said Surendra Brekwada alias Dasu, who surrendered with his wife Ruppi Pidikka alias Jaya, told them that a six-member "crack team" of the Maoists, led by Orissa CPI (Maoist) leader Azad alias Duna Keshav Rao, reached Jalespeta Ashram on 23 August evening and came across four lathi-wielding policemen. Brekwada, a sharpshooter, was one of the six who allegedly killed the 82-year-old Laxmanananda, Kishore Baba (45), Amritananda Baba (62), Mata Bhaktimayee (40) and Puranjan Ganthi (28), brother of one of the girl inmates of the tribal residential school.

In spite of claims that the case of Swamiji's murder has been solved, it is widely believed to be a cover up, based on doubts expressed by several senior investigators and experts on left-wing extremism. Subash Chouhan, national co-convener of the Bajrang Dal, refused to accept that the Maoists were responsible, saying "Why all of a sudden so many days after the incident has [Panda] come and spoken to the television channels?".

Convictions
On 30 September 2013, Additional district judge Rajendra Kumar Tosh at an Additional district and sessions court in Phulbani convicted seven Pano Catholics   for the murder: Gadanath Chalanseth, Bijaya Kumar Shyamseth, Buddha Nayak, Sanatan Badamajhi, Duryadhan Sunamajhi, Bhaskar Sunamajhi and Munda Badamajhi. However, on 1 October 2013, the same court also convicted a Maoist leader from Andhra Pradesh for the same crime. 

Six days later the same court set free five accused who were being tried for burning of a Catholic house in the riots following the murder. Sajan George, president of Global Council of Indian Christians alleged that the court is biased against the Dalit Catholic minority. The defence lawyer, S.K. Padhi said that the ruling would be appealed against in the Odisha High Court.

See also
Christian mission
Graham Staines

References

Murder in India
2000s in Orissa
Murder in Odisha
Violence against Hindus in India
August 2008 events in India
2008 murders in India
Communist terrorism
Deaths by person in India
Violence in India
Persecution by Christians
Christian terrorism in Asia
Religiously motivated violence in India
People murdered in Odisha
Indian murder victims